Dumb Luck is the fourth studio album by American electronic music artist Dntel. It was released through Sub Pop on April 24, 2007. Recorded between 2002 and 2006, it includes vocal contributions from Ed Droste (Grizzly Bear), Valerie Trebeljahr and Markus Acher (Lali Puna), Jenny Lewis (Rilo Kiley), Grant Olsen and Sonya Westcott (Arthur & Yu), Mia Doi Todd, Andrew Broder (Fog), Conor Oberst (Bright Eyes), and Christopher and Jennifer Gunst (Mystic Chords of Memory).

Critical reception 
At Metacritic, which assigns a weighted average score out of 100 to reviews from mainstream critics, Dumb Luck received an average score of 60% based on 22 reviews, indicating "mixed or average reviews".

Jimmy Newlin of Slant Magazine gave the album 2 stars out of 5 and called it "a work that is genuinely, though only sporadically, beautiful, but no less emotionally dull." Jason Crock of Pitchfork gave the album a 6.8 out of 10 and commented that "While some of the album's songs are terrifically cloying, I can't call it a disappointment; it's more a case of diminishing returns."

Track listing

Charts

References

External links 
 

2007 albums
Dntel albums
Sub Pop albums